You Only Live Once is a 1952 West German comedy film directed by Ernst Neubach and starring Theo Lingen, Marina Ried and Rudolf Platte. It was a remake of the 1931 film The Man in Search of His Murderer.

It was shot at the Spandau Studios in Berlin. The film's sets were designed by Emil Hasler and Walter Kutz.

Partial cast
 Theo Lingen as Robert Heinemann
 Marina Ried as Kiki Marshall
 Rudolf Platte as Thomas
 Lisa Stammer as Lilian
 Paul Hörbiger as Karl Heinemann
 Siegfried Breuer as Rollincourt
 Wolfgang Neuss as Boxer-Willy
 Erich Fiedler as Nat Pinkerton
 Klaus Günter Neumann as Heinrich
 Ruth Stephan as Frl. Rosa

References

Bibliography

External links 
 

1952 films
1952 comedy films
German comedy films
West German films
1950s German-language films
Remakes of German films
German black-and-white films
Films shot at Spandau Studios
1950s German films